The following highways are numbered 762:

Canada

United States